Ueli Schnider (born 29 March 1990) is a Swiss cross-country skier. He competed in the World Cup 2015 season.

He represented Switzerland at the FIS Nordic World Ski Championships 2015 in Falun.

Cross-country skiing results
All results are sourced from the International Ski Federation (FIS).

Olympic Games

World Championships

World Cup

Season standings

References

External links 
 

1990 births
Living people
Swiss male cross-country skiers
Tour de Ski skiers
Cross-country skiers at the 2018 Winter Olympics
Olympic cross-country skiers of Switzerland